The Naracoorte Lucindale Council is a local government area in the Australian state of South Australia located in the Limestone Coast region in the south-east of the state adjacent to the Victorian border.

It was created on 1 December 1998 following the amalgamation of the District Council of Naracoorte and the District Council of Lucindale.

The districts economy is agricultural based, with cereal crops, sheep and beef predominantly farmed. It has a substantial tourist industry as well, with the Naracoorte Caves, Wonambi Fossil Centre and the seasonal Bool and Hacks Lagoons Wetlands being the main attractions.

Geography

The council encompasses the major towns of Naracoorte and Lucindale, as well as the smaller towns and localities of Binnum, Cadgee, Coles, Conmurra, Fox, Frances, Hynam, Joanna, Keppoch, Koppamurra, Kybybolite, Laurie Park, Lochaber, Mount Light, Moyhall, Spence, Stewart Range, Struan, The Gap, Wild Dog Valley, Woolumbool and Wrattonbully, and parts of Avenue Range, Bool Lagoon and Clay Wells.

Facilities

The towns of Naracoorte and Lucindale collectively have all major facilities expected by visitors to the area, including supermarkets, speciality stores, restaurants and accommodation in a range of forms.

The district has a number of education and health facilities, with Naracoorte having a high school and 3 primary schools, a hospital, the Naracoorte Swimming Lake and Lucindale a public library and Area School.

The area also has a number of sporting clubs.

Councillors

Naracoorte Lucindale Council has a directly-elected mayor.

See also
List of parks and gardens in rural South Australia

References

External links
Council's Website
LGA Site
Naracoorte Tourism Site

Local government areas of South Australia
Limestone Coast